The UCLA Chicano Studies Research Center (CSRC) was founded in 1969 to foster multidisciplinary research efforts at the University of California, Los Angeles (UCLA). It is one of four ethnic studies centers established at UCLA that year, all of which were the first in the nation and have advanced our understanding of the essential contributions of people of color to U.S. history, thought, and culture. The centers remain the major organized research units in the University of California system that focus on ethnic and racial communities and contribute to the system's research mission.

Organization
The CSRC serves the entire campus and supports faculty and students in the social sciences, life sciences, humanities, and the professional schools. Its research addresses the past and also growing Chicano and Latino population, which now constitutes nearly one-third of California and one-half of Los Angeles, but continues to have disproportionately low access to higher education. The CSRC is one of four ethnic studies centers established at UCLA in 1969 that are now part of the Institute of American Cultures (IAC), which reports to the Office of the Chancellor at UCLA. The CSRC is also a founding member of the national Inter-University Program for Latino Research (IUPLR, est. 1983), a consortium of Latino research centers that now includes twenty-five institutions in the United States.

Facilities
The CSRC houses a library, special collections archive, an academic press, research programs, community-based partnerships, and two competitive grant/fellowship programs organized through the IAC. Each year the CSRC is able to augment grants and fellowships through funds created specifically for research at the CSRC. These include Los Tigres del Norte Fund, the Tamar Diana Wilson Fund, and the Carlos M. Haro Scholarship Fund.

Since the 1970s, the CSRC holds six "institutional FTE" or faculty positions that are placed on loan to departments. These positions were originally designed to increase the center's research capacity, but they also allow the center to serve as a vital force across campus for diversifying the curriculum and the faculty.

Press
The UCLA Chicano Studies Research Center Press publishes research by and about Mexican Americans. The Press was partly responsible for the founding and flowering of Chicano studies in the 1970s—launching the careers of young academics who could not find mainstream publishers. The press has published the journal of record in the field, Aztlán: A Journal of Chicano Studies, for over thirty-five years. It has also published over 100 scholarly books, research reports, reference guides, policy briefs, newsletters, and DVDs. Four books published by the CSRC in 2012 won 10 awards in eight different categories at Latino Literacy Now's 15th annual International Latino Book Awards. As of 2013, the Press has received a total of 24 book awards.

Three CSRC Press series are of special note. The A Ver: Revisioning Art History book series is a ground-breaking effort to document the work of prominent individual Latino artists. As of 2013, the published volumes are on Gronk, Yolanda M. Lopez, Celia Álvarez Muñoz, María Brito, Carmen Lomas Garza, Malaquias Montoya, Rafael Ferrer, and Ricardo Valverde. The Chicano Archives book series includes reference guides to UCLA library special collections on Chicanos, with histories and finding aids. Subjects include the renowned community arts organization Self Help Graphics & Art in East Los Angeles, the Robert Legorreta–Cyclona Collection, the Mexican Museum of San Francisco Papers, the Oscar Castillo Papers and Photograph Collection,  the Latino Theatre Initiative/Center Theatre Group Papers, and the Arhoolie Foundation's Strachwitz Frontera Collection of Mexican and Mexican American Recordings. The Chicano Cinema & Media Arts series is an effort to preserve the many important Chicano films and videos that are no longer available. The first DVD is about the two earliest Chicano art documentaries; subsequent DVDs have focused on the video work of individual Chicano artists, including Laura Aguilar, Harry Gamboa Jr., and Gronk. Through its many publications, the press has shaped opinion, policy, and research on the Chicano population, both nationally and internationally.

Library
Established in 1969, the UCLA Chicano Studies Research Center Library was the first library in the United States to focus on the Mexican-descent population. Today, it continues to serve the needs of students and faculty at UCLA and around the world. The CSRC is a non-circulating library, though most materials may be photocopied within the premises.

The Library's holdings consist of monographs, subject files, dissertations and theses, films, videotapes, audio recordings, and manuscript collections. The Library has also entered partnerships to provide online digital collections of music, photography, and the visual arts.

The Library hosts art exhibitions, film screenings, and meetings, and it works closely with other UCLA libraries, community-based resources, and other Latino archives.

Archive 
The CSRC Archive is considered to hold among the most important national and international research collections in existence on the Chicana and Chicano experience. The Archive holds over 120 collections including periodicals, original prints by Chicana/o artists, photographs, slides, papers, and records. Of special is the Archive's collection of monolingual and bilingual English and Spanish newspapers and journals published throughout the southwestern U.S. from the nineteenth century onward.

The Archive has recently taken on digital archive projects, and works with UCLA based libraries to provide access.

Former names 
Mexican American Cultural Center, UCLA
Chicano Cultural Center, UCLA
Chicano Studies Center, UCLA
Chicano Studies Research Center, UCLA

References

External links

Chicano Studies Research Center
Mexican-American organizations